Several ships of the Swedish Navy have been named HSwMS Tordön or HSwMS Thordön, named after the Old Norse word for thunder:

  was a bomb vessel launched in 1741 and decommissioned in 1784
  was a  launched in 1865 and decommissioned in 1922
  was a  launched in 1981 and sold in 2008

Swedish Navy ship names